The U.S. Post Office (also known as the Open Air Post Office) at 400 First Avenue North in St. Petersburg, Florida is a historic building. On April 4, 1975, it was added to the U.S. National Register of Historic Places.

See also 
List of United States post offices

References

External links 
 Pinellas County listings at National Register of Historic Places
 Florida's Office of Cultural and Historical Programs
 Pinellas County listings
 U.S. Open Air Post Office
 Open Air Post Office (United States Postal Service)

National Register of Historic Places in Pinellas County, Florida
Buildings and structures in St. Petersburg, Florida
Post office buildings on the National Register of Historic Places in Florida
Government buildings completed in 1917
1917 establishments in Florida